Ludwig Mach (8 November 1868 Prague – September 1951) was an Austrian physician and chemist.

Building on the work of Ludwig Zehnder in 1891, Mach added refinements to an instrument which became known as the Mach–Zehnder interferometer. He went on to employ photography for collecting visual data streamlines in the field of Aerodynamics.

Ludwig is the son of the physicist Ernst Mach.

See also
Velocimetry

References

1868 births
1951 deaths
Austrian physicists
Austrian chemists